Fifteens are a type of tray bake from Ulster. The recipe's name derives from the fact that it is typically made with 15 digestive biscuits, 15 marshmallows and 15 glacé cherries, which are combined with condensed milk and desiccated coconut.

The biscuits are crushed before being mixed in a bowl with chopped glacé cherries and miniature or chopped marshmallows. Condensed milk is then added as the binding ingredient. The mixture is then rolled into a log or sausage shape which is in turn rolled in the desiccated coconut and placed in a fridge to set. Once it has been in the fridge for a few hours the log is removed and cut into (traditionally) fifteen slices and served. The delicacy is traditionally offered with other tray bakes, buns or biscuits and is commonly enjoyed with a cup of tea. Fifteens are seldom found outside Northern Ireland and County Donegal.

References 

 
 
 

Cuisine of Northern Ireland